Punctapinella niphochroa is a species of moth of the family Tortricidae. It is found in Carchi Province, Ecuador.

References

Moths described in 1999
Euliini